MV Bute is a ferry owned by Caledonian Maritime Assets Limited and operated by Caledonian MacBrayne, on the route between Wemyss Bay and Rothesay on Bute.

History
There was much dissent over the decision to order a new ferry from outside the UK. Launched in Poland, she sailed for Scotland, arriving in Gourock on 28 June 2005. After successful berthing trials, she entered service on 11 July.

Layout
Like the  before her, she has bow and stern access. In addition she has a starboard vehicle ramp aft, which was used at Rothesay before the pier was converted to allow end-loading.

Passenger accommodation is on two levels: the first housing forward and aft lounges with a kiosk area and toilets between, while the second level is open deck space from the twin funnels to just forward of the bridge. The bridge sits on its own perch above the open deck. A single lift connects the car deck with the lounge.

Bute has Azimuth thruster units with engine-driven propellers, by means of a cardan shaft, mounted on a steerable pod, protruding beneath the hull. These made her harder to position at piers than her predecessors with Voith Schneider Propellers and led to delays in the first season.

Service

Bute operates the route between Wemyss Bay and Rothesay on the Isle of Bute, along with her sister ship . 

Being more manoeuvrable than the new vessels, the streakers  and  returned to provide the service during work to build a new end-loading linkspan at Rothesay pier in 2007.

While works were being carried out at Wemyss Bay pier, Bute and Argyle were temporarily relocated to Gourock in October 2015, making each crossing an hour long. Services resumed from Wemyss Bay in March 2016 after a £6 million pier upgrade was completed.

Footnotes

Caledonian MacBrayne
2005 ships
Ships built in Gdańsk